Dactyliophora is a genus of flowering plants belonging to the family Loranthaceae.

Its native range is Papuasia to Northern Queensland.

Species:

Dactyliophora novaeguineae 
Dactyliophora verticillata

References

Loranthaceae
Loranthaceae genera